Richard, Rick, Ricky, Rickey, or Ritchie Green may refer to:

Entertainment
 Richard Green (actor) (born 1953), American actor
 Richard Green or Grass Green (1939–2002), African American cartoonist
 Rick Green (comedian) (born 1953), Canadian comedian
 Richard Lancelyn Green (1953–2004), English Sherlock Holmes expert
 Richard Greene (1918–1985), British film and television actor
 H. Richard Greene, American actor

Politics
 Richard Green (politician) (1907–1961), Australian politician and judge

Science
 Richard Green (astronomer), American
 Richard Green (neuropharmacologist) (1944–2020), British
 Richard Green (sexologist) (1936–2019), American sexologist, physician, lawyer
 Richard J. Green (born 1964), American chemist

Sports
 Richard Green (cricketer) (born 1976), English cricketer
 Richard Green (footballer) (born 1967), English
 Richard Green (golfer) (born 1971), Australian golfer
 Richard Green (referee) (1937–1983), boxing referee
 Richard Green (rower) (1836–1921) sculling champion
 Richard Green (soccer) (born 1949), American soccer player
 Rick Green (footballer) (born 1952), English
 Rick Green (ice hockey) (born 1956), defenceman
 Rickey Green (born 1954), American basketball player
 Ritchie Green (1925–1999), Australian rules footballer

Other
 Richard Green (chancellor) (1936–1989), first black New York City School Chancellor
 Richard Green (curator), art curator and art historian
 Richard Green (shipowner) (1803–1863), English philanthropist and shipowner
 Richard Green (soldier) (1980–2002), Canadian soldier killed in 2002 by American friendly fire during a tour in Afghanistan
 Richard Green (technologist) (born 1955), Nokia's chief technology officer from 2010 until 2011
 Richard Green (telecommunication) (born 1936 or 1937), American telecommunications company executive
 Richard C. Green (1953–2015), economist
 Richard Firth Green, Canadian medievalist
 Richard G. Green (died 2001), American lawyer who championed civil rights and free speech
 Richard K. Green (born 1959), American economist
 Ricky Lee Green (1960–1997), serial killer

See also
Dick Green (disambiguation)
Richard Greene (disambiguation)